St. Christopher's School is an independent, co-educational, day, high school in New Alexandra Park, a suburb in Harare, Zimbabwe. The institution, founded in 2010, is owned and governed by St. Christopher's Trust. The school caters for children with learning challenges (such as ADHD and dyslexia).

St. Christopher's School is a member of the Association of Trust Schools (ATS) and the Head is a member of Conference of Heads of Independent Schools in Zimbabwe (CHISZ).

History
In 2008, a group of parents joined to discuss the possibility of setting up an alternative school for their children. Each of these children had faced their own challenges during primary school and their parents felt that they would benefit from a "smaller, more intimate and less pressurised" learning environment.

Initially, the school started off in a house on Harry Pichanick Road, New Alexandra Park, transforming bedrooms and living rooms into classrooms, a staff room and an administration office. The school then moved to its present site. In 2009, the school accepted its first class of eight students. At first, the policy was to keep its class size at ten pupils maximum but due to demand determined by entrance examinations for Form One, the school increased its class size to twelve pupils.

In 2013, the school had its first class of Form Fours (Year 10), writing IGCSEs.

Academics
Pupils from Form 1 to Upper 6 are taught in classes of no more than 14 children. The IGCSE, AS Level and A Level syllabuses developed and examined by Cambridge International Examinations are followed in all subjects with much greater attention given to detail and individual differences, needs and abilities.

The subjects offered are:

Sports

All of the students are fully integrated into the sporting programme offered by the Hellenic Academy. Many of the students are also involved in additional sports, such as motor-cross, rowing, horse riding, and triathlon.

See also

 List of schools in Zimbabwe

References

External links
 
 St. Christopher's School profile on the ATS website
 

Schools in Harare
Private schools in Zimbabwe
Cambridge schools in Zimbabwe
Co-educational schools in Zimbabwe
High schools in Zimbabwe
Day schools in Zimbabwe
Educational institutions established in 2010
2010 establishments in Zimbabwe
Member schools of the Association of Trust Schools